Taoufik Chobba (born 14 December 1982) is a Tunisian boxer. He competed in the men's lightweight event at the 2004 Summer Olympics.

References

1982 births
Living people
Tunisian male boxers
Olympic boxers of Tunisia
Boxers at the 2004 Summer Olympics
Place of birth missing (living people)
Lightweight boxers
21st-century Tunisian people